The 22177/22178 Mahanagari Express is an express train, belonging to Indian Railways, that runs between Mumbai CSMT and  in India. It operates as train number 22177 from Mumbai CSMT to Varanasi Junction and as train number 22178 in the reverse direction. Mahanagri Express is converted ICF coaches into LHB coaches in year 2023.

Coach composition

The train consists of 22 coaches:

 1 AC II Tier
 2 AC III Tier
 14 Sleeper coaches
 4 General
 2 Second-class Luggage/parcel van

Traction

Mumbai CSMT–Varanasi Junction: BSL/ET WAP-4

As Indian Railways completed its 100%  Electric conversion on this route it is now regularly hauled by Itarsi or Bhusawal-based WAP-4 from Mumbai CSMT to Varanasi Junction

Rake sharing arrangement

It has no RSA with any trains.

Timetable

11093- Leaves Mumbai CSMT at night 12:10 AM and reaches Varanasi next day morning 4:40 AM IST
11094- Leaves Varanasi Jn every day at 11:20 AM IST and reaches Mumbai CSMT next day at afternoon 2:15 PM IST.

Route and halts 

The important halts of the train are:

 
  Central
 
 
 
 
 Nashik Road
 
 
 
 
 
 
 
 
 
 
 
 
 
 
 
 

Mahanagari ExpressMahanagari Express

References 

Named passenger trains of India
Rail transport in Maharashtra
Rail transport in Madhya Pradesh
Passenger trains originating from Varanasi
Transport in Mumbai
Railway services introduced in 1981
Express trains in India